The Edmonton Eskimos faced the Montreal Alouettes in the Grey Cup game for the third consecutive year. And for the third consecutive year, the Edmonton Eskimos were Grey Cup champions. It was the first time in a Grey Cup that a touchdown was worth six points instead of five.

Canadian Football News in 1956
On Sunday, January 22, representatives of the two largest and most powerful leagues in the Canadian Rugby Union, the Interprovincial Rugby Football Union and the Western Interprovincial Football Union, met in Winnipeg and formed the Canadian Football Council as an umbrella organization. G. Sydney Halter, QC, was named as commissioner of the CFC, which would evolve into today's Canadian Football League.  The CFC introduced a national negotiation list.

Television rights for Canadian football games were sold for $101,000. The touchdown point value was increased from five to six points.

The first East-West All-Star game was played at Vancouver's Empire Stadium on December 8. The day after the game, Trans-Canada Air Lines Flight 810 crashed into Mount Slesse, killing five players and one official who were on their way from Vancouver to Calgary. The five players who died in the crash included four members of the Saskatchewan Roughriders: offensive linemen Mario DeMarco and Ray Syrnyk, centre/tight end Mel Becket, and defensive lineman Gordon Sturtridge, along with Winnipeg Blue Bomber offensive lineman Cal Jones. The official killed in the crash was Ed Pettit, of Calgary.

Regular season

Final regular season standings
Note: GP = Games Played, W = Wins, L = Losses, T = Ties, PF = Points For, PA = Points Against, Pts = Points

Bold text means the team clinched a playoff berth.
Edmonton and Montreal had first-round byes.
X – Rochester withdrew from the league.

Grey Cup playoffs
Source:

Note: All dates in 1956

Semifinals

Saskatchewan won the total-point series 50–26. The Roughriders moved on to play the Edmonton Eskimos in the WIFU Finals.

The Tiger-Cats advanced to play the Montreal Alouettes in the IRFU Finals.

Finals

Edmonton won the best of three series 2–1 and advanced to the Grey Cup game.

 Montreal won the total-point series 78–62 and advanced to the Grey Cup game.

Playoff bracket

Grey Cup Championship

Canadian Football Leaders
 CFL Passing Leaders
 CFL Rushing Leaders
 CFL Receiving Leaders

1956 Eastern (Interprovincial Rugby Football Union) All-Stars
Offence
QB – Sam Etcheverry, Montreal Alouettes
RB – Cookie Gilchrist, Hamilton Tiger-Cats
RB – Pat Abbruzzi, Montreal Alouettes
RB – Dick Shatto, Toronto Argonauts
E  – Hal Patterson, Montreal Alouettes
E  – Bobby Simpson, Ottawa Rough Riders
FW – Joey Pal, Montreal Alouettes
C  – Tommy Hugo, Montreal Alouettes
OG – Francis Machinsky, Toronto Argonauts
OG – Larry Hayes, Ottawa Rough Riders
OT – Kaye Vaughan, Ottawa Rough Riders
OT – Bill Albright, Toronto ArgonautsDefence
DT – Kaye Vaughan, Ottawa Rough Riders
DT – Bill Albright, Toronto Argonauts
DE – Pete Neumann, Hamilton Tiger-Cats
DE – Jim Miller, Montreal Alouettes
DG – Vince Scott, Hamilton Tiger-Cats
MG – Hardiman Cureton, Toronto Argonauts
LB – Tommy Hugo, Montreal Alouettes
LB – Ken Vargo, Montreal Alouettes
DB – Hal Patterson, Montreal Alouettes
DB – Ralph Goldston, Hamilton Tiger-Cats
DB – Ray Truant, Hamilton Tiger-Cats
S  – Don Pinney, Ottawa Rough Riders

1956 Western (Western Interprovincial Football Union) All-Stars
Offence
QB – Jackie Parker, Edmonton Eskimos
RB – Ken Carpenter, Saskatchewan Roughriders
RB – Ed Vereb, British Columbia Lions
RB – Normie Kwong, Edmonton Eskimos
RB – Bob McNamara, Winnipeg Blue Bombers
E  – Don Edwards, British Columbia Lions
E  – Bud Grant, Winnipeg Blue Bombers
C  – Mel Becket, Saskatchewan Roughriders
C  – George Druxman, Winnipeg Blue Bombers
OG – Harry Langford, Calgary Stampeders
OG – Buddy Alliston, Winnipeg Blue Bombers
OT – Martin Ruby, Saskatchewan Roughriders
OT – Buddy Tinsley, Winnipeg Blue BombersDefence
DT – Dick Huffman, Calgary Stampeders
DT – Martin Ruby, Saskatchewan Roughriders
DE – Frank Anderson, Edmonton Eskimos
DE – Gord Sturtridge, Saskatchewan Roughriders
MG – Ron Atchison, Saskatchewan Roughriders
LB – John Wozniak, Saskatchewan Roughriders
LB – Earl Lindley, Edmonton Eskimos
LB – Bobby Marlow, Saskatchewan Roughriders
LB – Ted Tully, Edmonton Eskimos
DB – Rollie Miles, Edmonton Eskimos
DB – Larry Isbell, Saskatchewan Roughriders
S  – Paul Cameron, British Columbia Lions

1956 Canadian Football Awards
 Most Outstanding Player Award – Hal Patterson (DB/OE), Montreal Alouettes
 Most Outstanding Canadian Award – Normie Kwong (RB), Edmonton Eskimos
 Most Outstanding Lineman Award – Kaye Vaughan (OT/DT), Ottawa Rough Riders
 Jeff Russel Memorial Trophy (IRFU MVP) – Hal Patterson (DB/OE), Montreal Alouettes
 Jeff Nicklin Memorial Trophy (WIFU MVP) - Jackie Parker (QB), Edmonton Eskimos
 Gruen Trophy (IRFU Rookie of the Year) - Tommy Grant (RB), Hamilton Tiger-Cats
 Dr. Beattie Martin Trophy (WIFU Rookie of the Year) - Norm Rauhaus (DB), Winnipeg Blue Bombers
 Imperial Oil Trophy (ORFU MVP) - ???

References

 
Canadian Football League seasons